Philippe Desmet (born 29 November 1958) is a retired Belgian international footballer.

Honours

International 
Belgium

 FIFA World Cup: 1986 (fourth place)

References

 

1958 births
Living people
Belgian footballers
Belgium international footballers
Belgian expatriate footballers
1986 FIFA World Cup players
Ligue 1 players
Lille OSC players
Expatriate footballers in France
R. Charleroi S.C. players
Belgian Pro League players
K.V. Kortrijk players
Association football midfielders
People from Waregem
Footballers from West Flanders